Rodi Kratsa-Tsagaropoulou is a Greek politician who served as a Member of the European Parliament from 1999 to 2014, and served as First Vice-President of the European Parliament from 2007 to 2009. She is the current 
Regional Governor of the Ionian Islands.

She was born and brought up at the island of Zakynthos, Greece. She studied Sociology (specialising in political sociology) at the University of Geneva (Switzerland). Her postgraduate studies followed at the Institute of European Studies of the same university. She was first elected as an MEP in 1999. She was re-elected in 2004 and in 2009. Her parliamentary work was rich and multifaceted with numerous interventions on issues like European integration, regional cohesion and economic development of Europe, the upgrading of women's participation and the presence of the EU at international level.

European Parliament

Responsibilities as Member of the European Parliament 2009 - 2014

Member of the Committee on Economic and Monetary Affairs

Member of the Committee on Women's Rights and Gender Equality

Member of the Committee on Regional Development

Member of the Delegation to the Euro-Mediterranean Parliamentary Assembly (PA-UfM)

President of the PA-UfM Working Group on the Euro-Mediterranean University of Slovenia (EMUNI)

Member of the Delegation for relations with the Mashreq countries (Egypt, Jordan, Lebanon and Syria)

Member of the Delegation to the Euro-Latin American Parliamentary Assembly (EuroLat)

Member of the Delegation for relations with Mercosur countries (Argentina, Brazil, Paraguay and Uruguay)

Member of the Working Group for the Middle East, very active in the peace process between Arabs and Israel, the promotion of cooperation between the GCC and the EU for security and development in the Mediterranean as well as in dealing with international crises.

In the framework of her parliamentary legislative work, in her capacity as rapporteur, she prepared resolutions, adopted by the plenary, regarding the MEDA programs, the EU funding of Palestine and the situation of the women in Mediterranean.

She is founding member of various intergroups: "Francophonie and cultural diversity", "Disability", "Family and childhood", "Tourism", "Islands", "Social Economy", "Conservation and Sustainable Development".

Responsibilities in the Bureau of the European Parliament as Vice-President (2007–2012)

Conciliation (negotiation with the Council for the final shaping of European legislation, in the framework of the co-decision procedure)

Information and Communication Policy

Euro-Mediterranean cooperation including the Parliamentary Assembly of the Union for the Mediterranean (PA-UfM)

President of the PA-UfM Working Group on the Euro-Mediterranean University (EMUNI)

Euro-Arab relations

Rodi Kratsa has represented the European Parliament at International Summits, like the 2008 G8 Parliamentary Speakers' Meeting held in Tokyo and Hiroshima, Japan as well as the 2011 G20 Speakers' Consultation held in Seoul, South Korea.

Action 

International level

Active in the international and regional meetings of UNESCO issues concerning education, the promotion of women and the cultural heritage

Active in the framework of the International Organisation of Francophonie

Regular participant in international meetings of the International Monetary Fund and the World Bank and international fora, like the Crans Montana Forum, the Doha Forum, WISE Forum (Qatar Foundation), the Women as Global Leaders Conference (Zayed University, UAE) 

European level

Founding member of the Women of Europe Award (Brussels 1987)

President of the International Association for the Promotion of Women of Europe - Women of Europe Award (Brussels 2000)

Member of the Board of the European Centre of Culture (Geneva)

Member of the Cultural Council of the Union for the Mediterranean (France - 2009)

National level

Elected member of the Municipality Council of Athens (1998)

Member of the Board and the Executive Committee of the Constantinos Karamanlis Institute for Democracy (Athens, 1997)

Founding member and President of the European Centre of Communication and Information (Athens, 1989)

Founding member of the Greek part of the European Movement

Member of the Board and the Scientific Committee of the Child and Family Foundation (Athens)

Family

Rodi Kratsa is married to former Member of Greek Parliament and former Minister of Transports and Communications of New Democracy party, Apostolos Kratsas. They have two children, George, who studied law in London and Paris, specialises in European competition law (LSE University) and is now a PhD candidate, and Constance, who studied law and economics in London and specialises in trade and company law (UCL University).

External links
 
 

1953 births
Living people
People from Zakynthos
New Democracy (Greece) MEPs
MEPs for Greece 1999–2004
MEPs for Greece 2004–2009
MEPs for Greece 2009–2014
20th-century women MEPs for Greece
21st-century women MEPs for Greece
Commanders of the National Order of the Cedar